Soft tennis is an Asian Games sport since the 1994 edition. It was featured at the 1990 Asian Games in Beijing, China, as a demonstration sport.

Editions

Events

Medal table

Participating nations

List of medalists

External links
Medallists from previous Asian Games - Soft tennis

 
Sports at the Asian Games
Asian Games
Asian Games